Steve Ellis is an American comic book artist and illustrator who has worked for Wizards of the Coast, DC Comics, Wildstorm, White Wolf, Moonstone Books and Marvel Comics.

Career
Ellis is the illustrator and co-creator behind The Silencers (with Fred Van Lente) and High Moon (with David Gallaher).

Steve Ellis’ work has been featured on CD covers, computer games, trading cards, books, RPGs, magazines, toys and comics. Ellis worked for Marvel Comics, DC Comics, Wizards of the Coast, and Upper Deck, among other companies. His Dungeons & Dragons work for Wizards of the Coast includes interior illustrations for Libris Mortis, Frostburn, Lords of Madness, Complete Adventurer, and Player's Handbook II.

While acting as penciler and inker for Marvel Comics and DC Comics’ famous properties like Lobo, Iron Man, and Green Lantern, Ellis has spearheaded such new titles as Wildstorm’s Jezebelle and the Marvel/Epic lines’ Crimson Dynamo. He has created the critically successful science fiction comic series Tranquility, his super-powered Mob epic The Silencers (with co-conspirator Fred Van Lente) and has had success winning the Zuda Comics online comics competition with fan favorite High Moon. He has also done numerous cover illustrations for books and games. Steve Ellis took over artistic duties on Green Lantern Corps for DC Comics during their "Convergence" event in 2015.

Affiliations 
Ellis has been a Society of Illustrators member since 2000, and is a founding member of Drawbridge studio (Hypothetical Island/XOXO).

Awards
Ellis's creation High Moon (with collaborator David Gallaher and Scott O. Brown) won the "Best Online Comic" Harvey award for 2009.
Ellis was nominated for a 2010 Harvey Award for Best Inker. as well as "Best Online Comic" for High Moon 
Ellis was nominated for a 2011 Harvey Award for Best Inker.
Ellis was nominated for a 2013 Harvey Award for Best Inker and Best Cover
Ellis (with collaborator David Gallaher and Scott O. Brown) was nominated for a 2014 Harvey Award for "The Only Living Boy" in the "Best Graphic Publication for Young Readers" category
Ellis (with collaborator David Gallaher) was nominated for a 2016 Harvey Award for "The Only Living Boy" in the "Best Graphic Publication for Young Readers" category
Ellis was nominated for "Best Artist" in the 2019 Ringo Awards for his work on "The Only Living Boy". His work The Only Living Boy Omnibus also received a nomination for "Best Presentation in Design" category

Bibliography

Acclaim Comics
 H.A.R.D Corps
 Ninjak

Amazon Studios
 It Came In The Mail storyboards

AMC
 Turn
 Breaking Bad: The Cost of Doing Business
 Breaking Bad: All Bad Things
 Better Call Saul: Client Development

Archaia
 Immortals: Gods & Heroes

Bottled Lightning
 The Only Living Boy (with writer and co-creator David Gallaher)
 The Only Living Girl (with writer and co-creator David Gallaher)

comiXology
 Box 13 (with writer and co-creator David Gallaher)
 Box 13: The Pandora Process (with writer and co-creator David Gallaher)

Dark Horse Comics
 The Silencers

DC Comics
 High Moon - Zuda webcomic imprint - with writer and co-creator David Gallaher
 Green Lantern
 Green Lantern Corps
 Hawkman
 Lobo

Image Comics
 Deadlands: The Devil's Six Gun (with writer and co-creator David Gallaher)

White Wolf
 Aberrant's Aberrant: Elites
 Aberrant's Aberrant Players Guide
 Aberrant's Aberrant: The Directive
 Aberrant's Aberrant Worldwide: Phase I
 Aberrant's Aberrant: Year One
 Changeling: The Dreaming's The Fool's Luck: The Way of the Commoner
 Changeling: The Dreaming's Land of Eight Million Dreams
 Demon: The Fallen's Demon Storytellers Companion
 Demon: The Fallen's Demon: The Fallen Rulebook
 Hunter: The Reckoning's Hunter Book: Avenger
 Hunter: The Reckoning's Hunter Book: Defender
 Hunter: The Reckoning's Hunter Survival Guide
 Kindred of the East's Killing Streets
 Mage: The Ascension's Guide to the Technocracy
 Mage: The Ascension's Mage: The Ascension Revised Edition
 Vampire: The Masquerade's Clanbook: Ventrue Revised
 Werewolf: The Apocalypse's Apocalypse
 Werewolf: The Apocalypse's Werewolf: The Apocalypse Revised Edition
 World of Darkness (old)'s World of Darkness: Time of Judgment

DreamSmith Books Publishers
 Tranquility (as artist, co-creator, and co-writer)

Scholastic Books
 Confessions of a Teenage Vampire (as artist and co-creator)

Wildstorm
 Jezebelle with co-creator Ben Raab
 Gen 13

Marvel Comics
 Iron Man
 Spider-Woman
 Crimson Dynamo with co-creator John Jackson Miller
 All-New Official Handbook of the Marvel Universe A to Z: Update (2007)
 Darkhawk
 Hulk: Winter Guard
 Darkstar and The Winter Guard

Moonstone Books
 Werewolf: The Apocalypse Bone Gnawers - 'Scavenger Hunt: Project Reaper'
 Werewolf: The Apocalypse Fianna

References

External links

Read High Moon on Zuda
High Moon Production Blog
The Silencers on Moonstone Books

20th-century American painters
21st-century American painters
American bloggers
American comics writers
American graphic novelists
American illustrators
American male bloggers
American male novelists
American speculative fiction artists
Fantasy artists
Game artists
Living people
Novelists from New York (state)
Painters from New York City
Role-playing game artists
Science fiction artists
Writers from Brooklyn
Year of birth missing (living people)